The National University Toribio Rodríguez de Mendoza (UNTRM) is a state-owned university in Chachapoyas, Peru. The UNTRM was founded on September 18, 2000.

In 2016, it was the first Peruvian university to clone an animal: the calf "Alma"

See also
 Official website
 List of universities in Peru

References

External links
 National University Toribio Rodríguez de Mendoza website

Universities in Peru